Mynonebra is a genus of longhorn beetles of the subfamily Lamiinae, containing the following species:

 Mynonebra diversa Pascoe, 1864
 Mynonebra opaca Fisher, 1925
 Mynonebra villica Pascoe, 1864

References

Desmiphorini